Elizabeth is the original soundtrack of the 1998 Academy Award and Golden Globe-winning film Elizabeth starring Cate Blanchett, Geoffrey Rush, Christopher Eccleston, Richard Attenborough and Joseph Fiennes. The original score was composed by David Hirschfelder.

The album won the BAFTA Award for Best Film Music and was nominated for the Academy Award for Best Original Dramatic Score (lost to the score of the film La vita è bella).

At the ARIA Music Awards of 1999 the soundtrack was won the ARIA Award for Best Original Soundtrack, Cast or Show Album.

Track listing

References

A. R. Rahman soundtracks
1998 soundtrack albums